Eptatretus hexatrema, the sixgill hagfish or snotslang, is a species of marine fish in the hagfish family (family Myxinidae) of order Myxiniformes. It is native to the South Atlantic Ocean and southwestern Indian Ocean.

Distribution
Southeast Atlantic: known only from Walvis Bay, Namibia to Durban, South Africa

Description 
Maximum recorded length 80.0 cm. Depth of body 15 times total length. Six gill openings. Colour slaty grey. Egg cases ovoid about 30mm long by 12mm wide with anchor filaments at each end. Eel shaped, with six barbels on the head around the mouth. Epatches form white spots under the skin. Two rows of slime pores under the body. No paired fins, mouth has no jaws but has two protrusible rows of horny teeth.

Habitat and behaviour
Non-migratory marine demersal. Depth range 10 – 400 m, usually found between 10 and 45 m. Commonly burrows in muddy bottoms. Feeds mostly by scavenging on dead or disabled fish. Secretes large quantities of slime when provoked.

Importance to humans 
No commercial value, considered a pest by fishermen.

Conservation status 
Least concern

Name
Etymology: Eptatretus: Greek, epta = seven + Greek, tretos  = with holes.  hexatrema: ?
.

Common names: sixgill hagfish, snotslang

Synonyms: Bdellostoma hexatrema Müller, 1836. Heptatretus hexatrema (Müller, 1836)

References

External links

Myxinidae
Marine fauna of Southern Africa
Marine fish of South Africa
Fish described in 1836